Hernán Daniel Santana Trujillo (born 26 August 1990), known simply as Hernán, is a Spanish professional footballer who plays as a defensive midfielder or a central defender for Indian Super League club FC Goa.

Club career

Las Palmas
Born in Breña Baja, La Palma, Canary Islands, Hernán finished his development at UD Las Palmas. He made his debut as a senior with the reserves, in Tercera División.

Hernán played his first game as a professional on 12 February 2011, starting in a 5–0 away defeat against AD Alcorcón in the Segunda División. His second appearance came only on 1 October, in the 1–1 home draw with Real Murcia. In June 2012, he was definitely promoted to the first team.

Hernán scored his first goal in the second tier on 2 March 2013, in a 3–3 home draw against FC Barcelona B. He suffered a knee injury in August, being sparingly used during the campaign.

Hernán was an undisputed starter in 2014–15, featuring in 36 matches – play-offs included – and netting three times as the Amarillos returned to La Liga after a 13-year absence. On 1 July 2015, he signed a new three-year contract until 2018.

On 22 August 2015, Hernán made his debut in the Spanish top flight, in a 1–0 defeat at Atlético Madrid. He scored for the first time in the competition on 31 October of the same year, but in a 3–1 away loss to Real Madrid.

Sporting Gijón
On 26 January 2018, Hernán signed with Sporting de Gijón until the end of the second-tier season and three more. On 25 October 2020, he was loaned to Mumbai City FC of the Indian Super League. He started in all but one of his appearances for the latter, as they clinched their maiden league title.

NorthEast United
Hernán joined NorthEast United FC on 10 September 2021, on a two-year contract. He made his debut for the club on 20 November against Bengaluru FC in a 4–2 loss. He scored his first goal the following 14 January, opening the 1–1 draw at FC Goa.

Sichuan Jiuniu
Hernán moved to Sichuan Jiuniu F.C. from the China League One on 18 April 2022.

Honours
Mumbai City
Indian Super League: 2020–21

References

External links

1990 births
Living people
Spanish footballers
Footballers from Santa Cruz de Tenerife
Association football defenders
Association football midfielders
Association football utility players
La Liga players
Segunda División players
Tercera División players
UD Las Palmas Atlético players
UD Las Palmas players
Sporting de Gijón players
Indian Super League players
Mumbai City FC players
NorthEast United FC players
FC Goa players
China League One players
Sichuan Jiuniu F.C. players
Spanish expatriate footballers
Expatriate footballers in India
Expatriate footballers in China
Spanish expatriate sportspeople in India
Spanish expatriate sportspeople in China